The Soledad Bee is a weekly newspaper serving the town of Soledad, California and southern Monterey County. It has a circulation of 1,050 weekly paid readers.

The paper is a member of the Soledad Chamber of Commerce

The owner of the Soledad Bee is California publisher New SV Media.
 The current editor is Ryan Cronk.

History 
The Soledad Bee was established 1909 by Chester G. Kinnear. It was first mentioned in the Santa Cruz Evening News on October 20, 1909. In 1911, Kinnear was sued for libel for placing an advertisement against Maxwell Browne, who was a candidate for District Attorney at the time. Kinnear had already sold the paper to C. J. Giacomazzi by this point, but he was staying with the paper to help prepare Giacomazzi to run the paper.

In 1919, C. J. Giacomazzi returned from serving in the American Expeditionary Forces in France.

In 1967, Harry Casey, who also owned the Greenfield News and Gonzales Tribune, acquired the Soledad Bee. All of Casey's newspapers were printed in The King City Rustler plant. In 1981 Publisher Harry Casey, supported by the California Newspaper Publishers Association, insists that newspapers have the right to view police investigation reports. As a result, the California Newspaper Publishers Association talked to state legislators about changing the law to require the basic reporting of crimes. Casey continued to cover issues with the Soledad police department, especially as a grand jury investigated the department. The mayor, in response to the Bee's coverage, angrily complained that the Bee was "going out and digging up stuff" about the police department.

The Soledad Bee and associated weekly papers were sold to News Media Corporation in 1995. On July 1, 2019, New SV Media purchased the Bee along with three newspapers in the Salinas Valley area and the Watsonville Register-Pajaronian.

Awards 
The paper was recognized with a Merit Award by the California Newspaper Publishers' Association in 1971 and 1973.

References

External links 
 Soledad Bee website
 Chronicling America entry

Weekly newspapers published in California